Prince Prem Purachatra (12 August 1915 – 24 July 1981) was a Thai prince who worked as a diplomat, English instructor, publisher, poet, playwright, and author. He was a son of Prince Purachatra Jayakara and grandson of King Chulalongkorn (Rama V). He served as president of the Siam Society, was a fellow of the Royal Institute, headed the Department of Modern Languages at Chulalongkorn University (now the Language Institute, which is housed in a building bearing his name), and published the weekly English-language magazine Standard. He was married to Ngarmchit Purachatra.

Ancestors

Academic rank
 1954 Professor of Chulalongkorn University
 1955 Professor of Thammasat University

References

Thai male Phra Ong Chao
Thai writers
Thai diplomats
Chatrajaya family
Academic staff of Chulalongkorn University
Fellows of the Royal Society of Thailand
1915 births
1981 deaths
Thai male Mom Chao
20th-century Chakri dynasty